Joon-ki, also spelled Joon-gi, is a Korean masculine given name. Its meaning differs based on the hanja used to write each syllable of the name. There are 34 hanja with the reading "joon" and 68 hanja with the reading "ki" on the South Korean government's official list of hanja which may be registered for use in given names.

Min Joon-ki (born 1968), South Korean film director
Lee Joon-gi (born 1982), South Korean actor
Lee Jun-ki (born 1982), South Korean football player (Thai League 3)
Choi Joon-gi (born 1994), South Korean football player (J2 League)
Chong Jun-gi, representative to the 6th Congress of the Workers' Party of Korea, North Korea's ruling party

Fictional characters with this name include:
Park Jun-ki, in 2002 South Korean television series Trio
Kim Joon-ki, in 2014 South Korean film Innocent Thing
Han Joon-gi, in 2020 Japanese video game Yakuza: Like a Dragon

See also
List of Korean given names

References

Korean masculine given names